Two ships of the United States Navy have been named Aludra, after a star in the constellation Canis Major.

 , a Crater-class cargo ship active from 1942 until it was torpedoed in 1943.
 , a Alstede-class stores ship active from 1952 to 1969.

Sources
 

United States Navy ship names